Pusch is a surname. Notable people with the surname include:

 Alexander Pusch (born 1955), German fencer
 Kolja Pusch (born 1993), German soccer player
 Lotte Pusch (1890–1983), German physical chemist
 Lukas Pusch (born 1970), Austrian artist